The Peter Young Stakes, registered as the St George Stakes, is a Melbourne Racing Club Group 2 Thoroughbred horse race held under weight for age conditions over a distance of 1800 metres at Caulfield racecourse, Melbourne, Australia in late February. Total prize money is A$300,000.

History
The race was renamed in 2012 in honour of former Chairman of the Melbourne Racing Club, Peter Young who was involved in the rebranding of the Victoria Amateur Turf Club to the Melbourne Racing Club and the construction of the Sir Rupert Clarke Grandstand at Caulfield Racecourse.

1949 & 1951 racebooks

Name
1900–2011 – St George Stakes
2012 onwards – Peter Young Stakes

Distance
1900–1903 – 1 mile (~1600 metres)
1904–1972 – 1 miles (~1800 metres)
1973–1978  –  1800 metres
1979  –  1200 metres
1980–1981  –  1800 metres
1982  –  1600 metres
1983  –  1800 metres
1984–1987  –  1600 metres
1988–1994  –  1800 metres
1995  –  2000 metres
1996 onwards  –  1800 metres

Grade
1900–1978 – Principal Race.
1979 onwards – Group 2

Venue
During World War II the event was held at Flemington Racecourse.
In 1996 the event was held at Flemington Racecourse due to reconstruction of Caulfield Racecourse.

Gallery of noted winners

Winners

 2023 – Steinem
 2022 – Cascadian
 2021 – Paradee
 2020 – Miss Siska 
 2019 – Avilius 
 2018 – Gailo Chop 
 2017 – Stratum Star 
 2016 – Bow Creek 
 2015 – Mourinho 
 2014 – Fiorente
 2013 – Foreteller
 2012 – Lucas Cranach
 2011 – Heart Of Dreams
 2010 – La Rocket
 2009 – Theseo
 2008 – Princess Coup
 2007 – Pompeii Ruler
 2006 – Our Smoking Joe
 2005 – Elvstroem
 2004 – Lonhro
 2003 – Northerly
 2002 – Northerly
 2001 – Cent Home
 2000 – Royal Voyage
 1999 – Istidaad
 1998 – Dane Ripper
 1997 – Istidaad
 1996 – Racer's Edge
 1995 – Durbridge
 1994 – Durbridge
 1993 – Star Of The Realm
 1992 – Let's Elope
 1991 – Sydeston
 1990 – King's High
 1989 – Vo Rogue
 1988 – Vo Rogue
 1987 – Foxseal
 1986 – Mrs.Fitzherbet
 1985 – Torbek
 1984 – Penny Edition
 1983 – Getting Closer
 1982 – Lawman 
 1981 – †My Brown Jug / Hyperno 
 1980 – Minuetto
 1979 – Quiet Snort
 1978 – Unaware
 1977 – Ashbah
 1976 – Leilani
 1975 – Leilani
 1974 – Sobar
 1973 – Longfella
 1972 – Cyron
 1971 – Gay Icarus
 1970 – Rain Lover
 1969 – Rain Lover
 1968 – Winfreux
 1967 – Tobin Bronze
 1966 – Light Fingers
 1965 – Yangtze
 1964 – Sometime
 1963 – Aquanita
 1962 – Dhaulagiri
 1961 – Dhaulagiri
 1960 – Lord
 1959 – Lord
 1958 – Prince Darius
 1957 – Redcraze
 1956 – Somerset Fair
 1955 – Flying Halo
 1954 – Cromis
 1953 – Hydrogen
 1952 – Delta
 1951 – Comic Court
 1950 – Comic Court
 1949 – Carbon Copy
 1948 – Valcurl
 1947 – Attley
 1946 – Flight
 1945 – Tranquil Star
 1944 – Tranquil Star
 1943 – Sun Valley
 1942 – High Caste
 1941 – Tranquil Star
 1940 – High Caste
 1939 – Ajax
 1938 – Hua
 1937 – Young Idea
 1936 – Cuddle
 1935 – Farndale
 1934 – Danilo
 1933 – Eastern Chief
 1932 – Ammon Ra
 1931 – Phar Lap
 1930 – Amounis
 1929 – Black Duchess
 1928 – Black Duchess
 1927 – Heroic
 1926 – Whittier
 1925 – The Hawk
 1924 – The Hawk
 1923 – Easingwold
 1922 – Eurythmic 
 1921 – ‡race not held
 1920 – Artilleryman
 1919 – Mistico
 1918 – Desert Gold
 1917 – Patrobas
 1916 – Cyklon
 1915 – Land Of Song
 1914 – Jolly Beggar
 1913 – Cider
 1912 – Trafalgar
 1911 – Comedy King
 1910 – Alawa
 1909 – Soultline
 1908 – Mountain King
 1907 – Ellis
 1906 – Lady Wallace
 1905 – Billingsgate
 1904 – Scottish King
 1903 – Footbolt
 1902 – Wakeful
 1901 – Clean Sweep
 1900 – Parthian

† Dead heat

‡ An embargo on Melbourne racing was in force by the Victorian Cabinet

See also
 List of Australian Group races
 Group races

References

Horse races in Australia
Open mile category horse races
Caulfield Racecourse